The Dongsha Atoll National Park is the seventh national park of the Republic of China (Taiwan).

The marine park is located at Pratas Island (Dongsha Island) in the north of the South China Sea, and includes the Dongsha Atoll (Pratas Atoll), a circular atoll  in diameter with a tropical monsoon climate, and the surrounding seas.

The Park is managed by the Ministry of the Interior. It was established on 17 January 2007; and on 4 October of the same year an administrative office was set up in Kaohsiung City.

The park is not open to tourism due to environmental restoration, safety, and ecological studies currently in progress.

Oceanology

Ecology
Seagrass Beds are well formed in the atoll and in adjacent waters, providing rich bio-diversities of marine life from fish, jelly fish, squid, sicklefin lemon sharks, and rays to rarer sea turtles, Dugongs, and cetaceans (dolphins and whales). Recovery of green sea turtles has especially been noted. Possible use of the atoll as a breeding ground by lemon sharks have been speculated due to the numbers of infants that have been discovered. Dongsha Atoll is an important stepping-stone, that promotes regional genetic and potentially demographic connectivity in the South China Sea, because larvae from Dongsha can reach many South China Sea reefs. Thus, its protection as a national park can potentially benefit the whole region.

In the past, illegal fishing has damaged the park. In 2004, a project to restore and conserve the ecology was approved, then to explore the possibility of environmental education and tourism.

See also
 National parks of Taiwan
 List of tourist attractions in Taiwan

References

External links
 Dongsha Atoll National Park official site
 Dongsha Atoll Research Station(DARS)   by the National Sun Yat-sen University

National parks of Taiwan
Protected areas established in 2007
Geography of Kaohsiung
Tourist attractions in Kaohsiung
2007 establishments in Taiwan
Marine reserves